North East Worcestershire Ravens, also known as NEW Ravens, are a rugby league club based in [Hopwood], Worcestershire. They play in the Midlands Premier division of the Rugby League Conference and Midlands Rugby League attracting players from all over the West Midlands and Worcestershire and have become the largest Rugby League Club in the region boasting teams ranging from juniors to open age and have the only Masters team in the Midlands 

It all started when…

History of Rugby League in Worcestershire

David Baxendale Pickett loved Rugby League, despite playing Union up to County standard. But League gave him the excitement he craved despite not being on the pitch himself. To this end he decided that what new town Redditch needed was a Rugby League team so a small ad in Open Rugby was placed and brought forward a few Northern exiles who felt the same. The Redditch town emblem in a Kingfisher, so David decided to call his new team the Kingfishers however after a competition was held the winner was Redditch Halcyon - the Halcyon being an Australian Kingfisher. The name was the inspiration for the Royal blue kit with the red chest band.

The first game was in September 1984 Vs Wolverhampton University. 22 February 1989 marked the end of an era, when David Pickett died. Only 57 and just as his team was starting to come good. Georgie and Gay continued to run the club.

1991/92 season the Aussies returned and fired the lads up again and it turned out to be Halcyons most successful year ever - winning the Midlands Challenge Cup, the Heart of England 9s and was top of the MASWARLA league. At the end of 1993/94 season Georgie became pregnant with the baby due in September 1994. Unfortunately this meant the club could no longer continue and came to an end.

In 1996 Super League was born and Andy & Dean Cave started a team in Worcestershire called Worcester Royals. They had a few successful years in the southern conference and were twinned with St Helens and they actually got to walk on the pitch and do some fund raising up there and the lads had a coaching session. They changed the name to Worcester Saints. Saints struggled to secure a regular home ground for training and matches and therefore struggled to recruit players in the Worcester area. 2004 Saints called it a day at the end of the season.

History of Ravens 

North East Worcestershire Ravens League Football Club as its now known formed in 2005 when the RFL approached Jason Spafford asking him to form a team to fill the gap in the Midlands League left by the missing Worcester Saints. Redditch Ravens was formed by Jason Spafford and David Parsons took charge of it with the new home ground eventually being the 'Beehive' in Studley - the home of studley football ground. After moving around for several seasons we relocated around 2010 to Bromsgrove RU Club where much development work took place. This included a name change to North East Worcestershire Ravens thus widening the club's remit, a first Masters game, junior development programme, 'Challenge Mug' Competition, a visit of the RL Challenge Cup via the Warrington Wolves and the actual RL World Cup.

In 2014 the NEW Ravens relocated to Hopwood Park, the home of Kings Norton RU Club and from that time onwards came to be regarded as a very proactive RL club in the Midlands. The Challenge Mug competition continues to grow for the seniors with clubs coming from further a field, mixed touch rugby was developed, coaching courses run, junior development expanding even further with wider age ranges, festivals and camps with newly qualified Level 2 coaches, Masters RL developed further, the Seniors organised tours to Gateshead and Liverpool as well as junior all weekend festivals supported by partner Super League Club Saints, training in the use of defibrillators and recently Ravens juniors being selected as Macots for the 4 Nations double header at the Ricoh Stadium in Coventry. Midlands finals were hosted at Ravens in 2017 after a selection process as well as the club organizing regular trips to the RL Challenge Cup and Super League Grand Final for members and friends; distinctive on the field and off field clothing was developed. 

NEW Ravens are proud of the development so far and look forward to further expansion and development in the future. We have a well liked facebook page, Instagram and Twitter as well as the new website. The club continues to develop as a family orientated community Rugby League club.

Juniors

North East Worcestershire Ravens' junior teams take part in the Midlands Junior League.

External links
 Official site

Rugby League Conference teams
Rugby league teams in Worcestershire
Redditch
Rugby clubs established in 2005